Álvaro Calvo Masa (born 27 March 1983) is a Spanish basketball player who plays for Kigali Titans. He is a two-time Most Valuable Player of the Mozambican League.

Career
In his career, he has spent time in Europe, South America and Africa. Since 2018, Masa plays for Ferroviário de Maputo in Mozambique. He is a two-time Mozambican League champion and most valuable player. He was the leading scorer for his team in the 2021 BAL season with 19.8 points, helping Ferroviário reach the quarterfinals.

On 15 February 2023, Calvo Masa signed for the Kigali Titans of the Rwanda Basketball League (RBL).

BAL career statistics

|-
| style="text-align:left;"|2021
| style="text-align:left;"|Ferroviário
| 4 || 4 || 34.5 || .407 || .292 || .857 || 9.5 || 2.3 || 1.3 || .5 || 19.8
|-
| style="text-align:left;"|2022
| style="text-align:left;"|Salé
| 6 || 6 || 28.0 || .480 || .400 || .857 || 8.5 || 1.2 || 1.2 || .3 || 11.7
|-

References

External links
RealGM profile

1983 births
Spanish expatriate sportspeople in Burundi
Spanish expatriate sportspeople in Morocco
Spanish expatriate sportspeople in Mozambique
Spanish men's basketball players
Ferroviário de Maputo (basketball) players
Living people
People from Palencia
Sportspeople from the Province of Palencia
New Star BBC players
Small forwards
Club Melilla Baloncesto players
CB Valladolid players
AS Salé (basketball) players

Urunani BBC players